The 2019–20 Hobart Hurricanes Women's season was the fifth in the team's history. Coached by Salliann Briggs and captained by Corinne Hall, the Hurricanes finished seventh in WBBL05. They consequently failed to qualify for the finals for the third-consecutive season, but managed to avoid the wooden spoon for the first time since WBBL02.

Squad 
Each 2019–20 squad featured 15 active players, with an allowance of up to five marquee signings including a maximum of three from overseas. Australian marquees are players who held a national women's team contract at the beginning of the WBBL|05 signing period.

Personnel changes made ahead of the season included:

 Nicola Carey signed with the Hurricanes, departing the Sydney Thunder and becoming the team's first Australian marquee player since the retirement of Julie Hunter in 2016–17.
 Maisy Gibson and Belinda Vakarewa signed with the Hurricanes, also departing the Sydney Thunder.
 Tayla Vlaeminck signed with the Hurricanes, departing the Melbourne Renegades.
 Corinne Hall returned to the Hurricanes captaincy role, taking over from Sasha Moloney.
 English marquee Fran Wilson and South African marquee Chloe Tryon signed with the Hurricanes.
 Barbadian marquee Hayley Matthews signed as a replacement player for English marquee Heather Knight in the event of the Hurricanes qualifying for finals, but such a scenario did not eventuate.
 In what was effectively a straight swap with the Perth Scorchers, wicket-keeper Emily Smith joined the Hurricanes in place of the departing Georgia Redmayne. 
 On 18 November 2019, Smith was banned for the remainder of WBBL|05 after contravening Cricket Australia's anti-corruption policy with a social media post. Under a special exemption, Emma Manix-Geeves was brought into the Hurricanes squad as a replacement.

The table below lists the Hurricanes players and their key stats (including runs scored, batting strike rate, wickets taken, economy rate, catches and stumpings) for the season.

Ladder

Fixtures 

All times are local time

Statistics and awards 

 Most runs: Heather Knight – 282 (20th in the league)
 Highest score in an innings: Heather Knight – 77 (49) vs Sydney Thunder, 3 November
 Most wickets: Belinda Vakarewa – 20 (3rd in the league)
 Best bowling figures in an innings: Belinda Vakarewa – 4/19 (4 overs) vs Sydney Sixers, 20 November
 Most catches (fielder): Erin Fazackerley – 9 (3rd in the league)
 Player of the Match awards:
 Belinda Vakarewa – 2
 Nicola Carey, Erin Fazackerley – 1 each
 Hurricanes Player of the Tournament: Belinda Vakarewa
 WBBL|05 Team of the Tournament: Belinda Vakarewa
 WBBL|05 Young Gun Award: Tayla Vlaeminck (nominated)

References 

2019–20 Women's Big Bash League season by team
Hobart Hurricanes (WBBL)